Mathias Zahradka (16 January 1912 – June 1982) was an Austrian weightlifter. He competed in the men's featherweight event at the 1936 Summer Olympics.

References

External links

1912 births
1982 deaths
Austrian male weightlifters
Olympic weightlifters of Austria
Weightlifters at the 1936 Summer Olympics
Place of birth missing
20th-century Austrian people